Edmund Backhouse (1824 – 7 June 1906), banker, J.P. on the County Durham and for the North Riding of Yorkshire benches.  He was Member of Parliament for Darlington.

Family 
He was the youngest son of Jonathan Backhouse (1779–1842), banker, of Polam Hill, Darlington, and of his wife Hannah Chapman Backhouse, daughter of Joseph Gurney (1757–1841) and Jane Gurney, born Chapman  of Norwich.

Parents
Both parents were ministers of the Religious Society of Friends (Quakers), travelling in Great Britain and North America.

Marriage

Edmund Backhouse married Juliet Mary, daughter and sole heiress of Charles Fox of Trebah in Cornwall, and his wife, Sarah. After the death of his sister and brother-in-law, Jane and Barclay Fox, the Backhouses brought up their daughter, Jane Hannah Fox. They were the parents of Sir Jonathan Backhouse, 1st Baronet and grandparents of Sir Edmund Backhouse, 2nd Baronet, Admiral Oliver Backhouse (1876–1943), twins: Lt-Col Miles Roland Charles Backhouse (1878–1962), Admiral of the Fleet Sir Roger Roland Charles Backhouse (1878–1939) and Lady Harriet Findlay DBE (1880–1954).

Business
In 1845 he became a junior partner in Jonathan Backhouse & Company, the family bank.

Politics
In 1867, he was elected M.P. for Darlington as a Liberal. He was re-elected in 1874.  He retired from Parliament in 1880. He was succeeded by Theodore Fry.

Residence in Cornwall
He bought Trebah from his father-in-Law. He probably played a large part in the development of the remarkable garden, which is now open to the public.

Death
He died at Trebah on 7 June 1906, aged 82 years and was buried at the Quaker Burial Ground in Budock. His executors sold Trebah to Mr. and Mrs. Hext

Obituary in The Times
 "Mr. Backhouse was a genial good-hearted gentleman, at once a banker and a country squire. He was diligent and painstaking in all he undertook in public or private life, and was considered one of the ablest representatives sent from the north to Parliament. He was not an orator, but his speeches were characterised by good sense and extreme caution.  His judgement was considered safe and he was always conscientious."

References

External links 
 

1824 births
1906 deaths
Edmund
Liberal Party (UK) MPs for English constituencies
English Quakers
English bankers
UK MPs 1868–1874
UK MPs 1874–1880
Edmund Backhouse
19th-century English businesspeople